Parliamentary elections were held in Egypt on 24 May 1926. The result was a victory for the Wafd Party, which won 150 of the 215 seats.

Results

References

Egypt
Elections in Egypt
1926 in Egypt
May 1926 events
Election and referendum articles with incomplete results